John Dykes is a sports broadcaster.

John Dykes may also refer to:

John Bacchus Dykes (1823–1876), English clergyman and hymnist
John Dykes (rugby union) (1877–1955), Scottish rugby union international

See also

John Dyke (disambiguation)
Dykes (surname)